Imboden Fork or Imboden Creek is a stream in Iron and Reynolds counties of southeast Missouri. It is a tributary of the East Fork Black River.

The source area lies within the Mark Twain National Forest about three miles southwest of Belleview. The stream flows to the southwest and is followed by Missouri Route O through the forest. At its junction with Shut-in Creek the stream turns south and flows along Missouri Route MM past the community of Monterey and on to its confluence with the East Fork just north of Johnson's Shut-Ins State Park.

The stream was named for an early settler to the area.

References

Rivers of Iron County, Missouri
Rivers of Reynolds County, Missouri
Rivers of Missouri
Tributaries of the Black River (Arkansas–Missouri)